Tzitzit ( ṣīṣīṯ, ; plural  ṣīṣiyyōṯ,;) are specially knotted ritual fringes, or tassels, worn in antiquity by Israelites and today by observant Jews and Samaritans.  are usually attached to the four corners of the tallit gadol (prayer shawl), usually referred to simply as a  or ; and tallit katan (everyday undergarment).

Etymology

The word may derive from the Hebrew root  [n-ts-h].  shares this root with the Hebrew for 'lock of hair', or 'dreadlock'.

A popular etymological interpretation of  derives from another word which shares this root. ( 'budding flower') may once have referred to floral ornamentation on clothing. This hypothesis is supported by the fact that the custom of making fringes from extending the threads of embroidery was common in the ancient Near East as the means of strengthening the fabric. The further analyses of the antique iconography suggest that apart from this pragmatic purpose the tassels could also decorate the cloth and as such be a marker of the social status: the more elaborate and elegant the fringes, the higher the position of the owner. In addition to this and given the unique nature of each of the tassels it could also be used as a personal "signet" for sealing documents. This data has led the scholars to assume that the practice itself is of very ancient origins and evolved into Jewish ritual clothing where it was invested with religious meaning.

The ending  is the feminine adjectival suffix, used here to form a feminine singular noun. In the Hebrew Bible, this noun is used to refer to one or many tassels, but later scholars used the feminine plural . In English-language academic texts on Judaica the term is sometimes translated as show-fringes. The Septuagint translation is tassels (Greek plural  , from singular  ).

Torah sources
The Five Books of Moses mentions ritual fringes in two places:

Since the Hebrew word  can mean 'corner' or 'border', the specific place of the attachment of the fringes is unclear. Their exact number is also not specified. Lastly, the passage lacks any instructions on the binding of the fringes, save for the obligation to include "a cord of blue" (Heb. ).

The primary mnemonic purposes of this  are expressed clearly: wearing  reminds a daily practitioner to bring God's love into action by practicing all other . The paragraph from Numbers is included in daily prayer as the final paragraph of the Shema. Here,  also remind Jews that they are no longer slaves.

Rabbinic Judaism

Maimonides includes it as a major commandment along with circumcision and the Passover offering.

The tallit and tallit katan are four-cornered garments worn by practicing Jews which incorporate . The  garment itself is commonly referred to as .The tallit is typically worn over the shirt/ clothes, like a cloak, whereas the tallit katan (or arba kanfot) is smaller and worn underneath the clothing. It is a simplistic garment with a front and back fold, creating four corners to which the tzitzit are fastened. The blue thread mentioned in the Torah, tekhelet, is omitted by most Rabbinic Jews due to controversy over the dye-making process.

Fabrics
The medieval rabbis debated the source of the  obligation for garments made from different types of fabric. All agree that garments made from wool or linen (the typical materials of Biblical garments) require  by Biblical law. However, they debated whether the requirement is Biblical or rabbinic if the garment is made from any other material. The Shulchan Aruch ruled that this obligation is rabbinic, while the Rema ruled that it is Biblical.

The Torah forbids shatnez ("intertying" wool and linen together). However, unlike other forms of kil'ayim (combinations of various phenomena like planting different types of seed or ploughing with different animals), there is an exception to the rule:  was not only allowed but required in the priestly garments, which combined dyed-wool and linen threads. According to the rabbis, this exemption to  applied only while performing priestly service. Thus, according to rabbinic Judaism, both laymen and priests were supposed to wear mixtures of wool and linen all the time.

In practice, the rabbinic sages permitted using wool and linen strings in tandem only when what they hold to be genuine tekhelet is available.

Threads and knots

The tassel on each corner is made of four strands, which must be made with intent. These strands are then threaded and hang down, appearing to be eight. (It is customary that each of the four strands is made of eight fine threads, known as ). The four strands are passed through a hole (or according to some: two holes) 1-2 inches (25 to 50 mm) away from the corner of the cloth. There are numerous customs as to how to tie the tassels. The Talmud explains that the Bible requires an upper knot and one wrapping of three winds. The Talmud enjoined that between seven and thirteen  be tied, and that "one must start and end with the color of the garment". The Talmud described tying assuming the use of  dye. Following the loss of the source of the dye, various customs of tying were introduced to compensate for the lack of this primary element.

The two groups of four ends are double-knotted to each other at the edge of the garment near the hole. One of the four strands (known as the ) is made longer than the others.

In Ashkenazi custom, the four sections of winding number 7-8-11-13 winds, respectively. The total number of winds comes to 39, which is the same number of winds if one were to tie according to the Talmud's instruction of 13  of 3 winds each. Furthermore, the number 39 is found to be significant in that it is the gematria (numerical equivalent) of the words: "The Lord is One" (Deuteronomy 6:4). Others, especially Sephardi Jews, use 10-5-6-5 as the number of windings, a combination that represents directly the spelling of the Tetragrammaton (whose numerical value is 26).

Before tying begins, declaration of intent is recited:  ('for the sake of the commandment of ').

Interpretations

Rashi, a prominent Jewish commentator, bases the number of knots on a gematria: the word  (in its Mishnaic spelling) has the value 600. Each tassel has eight threads (when doubled over) and five sets of knots, totaling 13. The sum of all numbers is 613, traditionally the number of commandments in the Torah. This reflects the concept that donning a garment with  reminds its wearer of all Torah commandments, as specified in Numbers 15:39. (Rashi knots are worn by the majority of Ashkenazic Eastern European Jews.)

Nachmanides disagrees with Rashi, pointing out that the Biblical spelling of the word  has the gematria of 590 rather than 600, which upends Rashi's proposed gematria. The  strand serves this purpose, explains the Talmud, for the blue color of  resembles the ocean, which in turn resembles the sky, which in turn is said to resemble God's holy throne – thus reminding all of the divine mission to fulfill His commandments. (Nachmanides knots are worn by the majority of Sephardic Jews and Teimani Jews)

Modern Biblical scholar Jacob Milgrom notes than in ancient Middle Eastern societies, the corner of the garment was often elaborately decorated to "ma[k]e an important social statement", functioning as a "symbolic extension of the owner himself". He also notes that the Torah requires , normally a royal and priestly color, to be used by all Jews:

Color of the strings

Tekhelet

 is a color dye which the Hebrew Bible commands the Jews to use for one, two, or four of the eight half-strings hanging down (as interpreted in Rabbinic Judaism), or a number of cords ranging from one up to the same number of threads as the non- threads (according to opinions in Karaite Judaism). At some point following the destruction of the Second Temple, the knowledge and tradition about the correct method of the dye was lost for Rabbinic Judaism in Israel and since then, most rabbinic diaspora Jews and Israeli Jews as well have worn plain white  without any dyes. Some explain the black stripes found on many traditional prayer shawls as representing the loss of this dye.

In recent times, with the (debated) re-discovery of the Ḥillazon in the Murex trunculus mollusk, some have noted that one cannot fulfill the mitzvah of  without the  strand. This position, however, has been strongly disputed. Others have disputed whether the coloring that comes from the Murex trunculus is the same as the biblical , based on the fact that according to traditional Jewish sources  is supposed to be a dark shade of blue, while wool that was discovered in archaeological excavations and was found to have been colored with Murex dye is violet.

When  is used, there are varying opinions in rabbinic literature as to how many of the strands are to be dyed: one of eight (Rambam), two of eight (Raavad), four of eight (Tosafot). While the white threads are to be made of the material of the garment, rabbinic law instructs that the -dyed thread must be made of wool.
 
According to several rabbinic sages, blue is the color of God's Glory. Staring at this color aids in meditation, bringing us a glimpse of the "pavement of sapphire, like the very sky for purity", which is a likeness of the Throne of God. Many items in the Mishkan, the portable sanctuary in the wilderness, such as the Menorah, many of the vessels, and the Ark of the Covenant, were covered with a blue-violet cloth when transported from place to place.

The other threads
This may be interpreted either literally (by Rama) or as meaning the same colour as the main garment (Rambam). Normally, the garment itself is white so that the divergence does not arise. Similarly the threads may be made either of wool or of the same fabric as the garment; again many authorities recommend using a woollen garment so that all views are satisfied.

Tzitzit for women
In rabbinic law,  is considered a "time-dependent positive commandment", as the Torah (Numbers 15:39) mentions "seeing" one's , and one could not see them in the darkness of night, but rather only in daytime. In general, women are not required to perform time-dependent positive commandments, but may perform them if they choose to. Therefore, many Rishonim permitted women to wear  (including Isaac ibn Ghiyyat, Rashi, Rabbeinu Tam, Baal HaMaor, Rambam, Raaviyah, Rashba, and Ra'ah). Opinions differ on whether women may make the blessing on such "optional" commandments; in general Ashkenazi women make the blessing, and Sephardic women do not.

At the same time, other Rishonim, beginning with R' Meir of Rothenburg, hold that women should not wear  for various reasons. Some other sources mention concern for shaatnez or carrying on shabbat.

When the Satmar Rebbe's wife died, she was found to be wearing  (a ) under her clothes.

Women in Conservative Judaism have revived the wearing of the  since the 1970s, usually using colors and fabrics distinct from the traditional garment worn by men. Other women have adopted the  later in life, to connect with their communities, embody egalitarian values, or create a personalized connection to Judaism.

Karaite tzitzit

Karaites  have blue-violet threads in them. In contrast to rabbinic Jews, Karaites believe that the  source can be any dye, except those produced from impure (a definition mostly overlapping "un-kosher") species, such as the molluscs used by Rabbinic Jews. Instead, Karaites propose that the source of the dye was indigo or woad (Isatis tinctoria). Contrary to some claims, Karaites do not hang  on their walls.

Samaritan tzitzit

The  are always in the same color as the gown, which is usually white.

Another version of Samaritan  is the simple fringes on the sides of the very large white  worn by the priests when carrying a Torah scroll.

Similarly to most Orthodox rabbinic Jews, the Samaritans hold that the blue-violet  thread for their  was produced from a specific dye, and claim that the tradition for producing it was lost.

Contrary to some rumors, the Samaritans do not use either rabbinic or Karaite .

In archaeology and secular scholarship

They are believed to date to around the late 8th century BCE and late 7th century BCE, respectively, some time after the practice became part of regular ritual. The custom however, clearly predates these codes, and was not limited to Israel. Images of the custom have been found on several ancient Near East inscriptions in contexts suggesting that it was practiced across the Near East.

See also
 Christianity and fringed garments

References

External links
 AskMoses.com explains tzizit
 Chabad.org - Tzitzith - The Laws of Fringes Includes basic laws, blessings and diagrams.
 JewFAQ.org on tzitzit
 Instructions how to make Karaite Tzitzit
 The Laws of Tzitzit according to mainstream Ashkenazic and Sephardic opinions

Hebrew words and phrases in the Hebrew Bible
Hebrew words and phrases in Jewish law
Jewish religious clothing
Jewish ritual objects
Non-clerical religious clothing
Positive Mitzvoth
Prayer beads